Proto-Indo-European accent refers to the accentual (stress) system of the Proto-Indo-European language.

Description
Proto-Indo-European (PIE) is usually reconstructed as having had variable lexical stress: the placement of the stress in a word (the accent) was not predictable by its phonological rules. Stressed syllables received a higher pitch than unstressed ones, so PIE is often said to have had pitch accent similar to modern-day Japanese, not to be confused with systems of one or two syllables per word having one of at least two unpredictable tones, the tones all others being predictable.

PIE accent could be mobile so it could change place throughout the inflectional paradigm. This quality persisted in Vedic Sanskrit and Ancient Greek, as in the declension of athematic nouns,
 PIE  'foot, step'
 PIE nom. sg. *pṓds > Sanskrit pā́t, Ancient Greek 
 PIE gen. sg. *pedés > Sanskrit padás, Ancient Greek 
 PIE acc. sg. * > Sanskrit pā́dam, Ancient Greek ,
or in the conjugation of athematic verbs (compare Sanskrit root present first-person sg. émi, first-person plural imás).

Otherwise, the accent was placed at the same syllable throughout the inflection. Nouns are divided into barytones if they are accented on the first syllable and oxytones if they are accented on the last syllable:
 PIE barytone  'wolf' > Sanskrit nom. sg. vṛ́kas, gen. sg. vṛ́kasya, nom. pl. vṛ́kās
 PIE oxytone  'son' > Sanskrit nom. sg. sūnús, gen. sg. sūnós, nom. pl. sūnávas

PIE accent was also free so it could stand on any syllable in a word, which was faithfully reflected in the Vedic Sanskrit accent (the later Classical Sanskrit had a predictable accent):
 PIE  'carried' > Vedic bháramāṇas
 PIE  'holds' > Vedic dhāráyati
 PIE  'worships' > Vedic namasyáti
 PIE  'red' > Vedic rudhirás

As one can see, the placement of the reconstructed PIE accent is reflected in Vedic Sanskrit basically intact. According to the reflex of the PIE accent, Indo-European languages are divided into those with free accent preserved, either directly or indirectly, and those with fixed (or bound) accent. Free accent is preserved in Vedic Sanskrit (of modern Indo-Iranian languages, according to some and Pashto), Hellenic, Balto-Slavic and Anatolian. In Proto-Germanic, free accent was retained long enough for Verner's Law to be dependent on it, but later, stress was shifted to the first syllable of the word.

Reflexes
The Vedic accent is generally considered the most archaic, fairly faithfully reflecting the position of the original PIE accent. Avestan manuscripts do not have written accent, but we know indirectly that at some period the free PIE accent was preserved (e.g. Avestan *r is devoiced yielding -hr- before voiceless stops and after the accent — if the accent was not on the preceding syllable, *r is not devoiced).

Ancient Greek also preserves the free PIE accent in its nouns (see Ancient Greek accent), but with limitations that prevent the accent from being positioned farther than the third syllable from the end (next from the end if the last vowel was long). However, Greek is almost completely worthless for reconstructing the PIE accent in verbs, because (other than in a few cases) it is consistently positioned as close to the start as the rules allow.

Proto-Germanic initially preserved the PIE free accent, with some innovations.  In the last stage of Proto-Germanic, the accent was replaced by a stress accent on the first syllable of the word, but prior to that it left its traces in the operation of Verner's law.

Anatolian languages show traces of the old PIE accent in the lengthening of the formerly accented syllable. Compare:
 PIE *dóru 'tree; wood' > Hittite, Luwian tāru
 PIE *wódr̥ 'water' > Hittite wātar, but PIE  'waters' (collective) > Hittite widār

Some Balto-Slavic languages also retain traces of the free PIE accent. For the reconstruction of the Proto-Balto-Slavic accent, the most important evidence comes from Lithuanian, from Latvian (traditionally Lithuanian is thought as more relevant, but that role is being increasingly being taken over by Latvian), and from some Slavic languages, especially Western South Slavic languages and their archaic dialects. The Balto-Slavic accent is continued in the Proto-Slavic accent. Accentual alternations in inflectional paradigms (both verbal and nominal) are also retained in Balto-Slavic. It used to be held that Balto-Slavic has an innovative accentual system, but nowadays, according to some researchers, Balto-Slavic is taking a pivotal role in the reconstruction of the PIE accent (see below).

Indirect traces of the PIE accent are said to be reflected in the development of certain sounds in various branches. For the most part, however, these are of limited, if any, utility in reconstructing the PIE accent.

Unaccented words
Some PIE lexical categories could be unaccented (clitics). These are chiefly particles (PIE  'and' > Vedic -ca, Latin -que, Ancient Greek τε) and some forms of pronouns (PIE  'to me' > Vedic me).

Vedic Sanskrit evidence also indicates that the Proto-Indo-European verb could be unaccented in some syntactical conditions, such as in finite position in the main clause (but not sentence-initially, where verbs would bear whatever accent they would have borne in subordinate clauses). The same is true of vocatives, which would be deaccented unless they appeared sentence-initially.

Interpretation
No purely phonological rules for determining the position of PIE accent have been ascertained for now. Nevertheless, according to the traditional doctrine, the following can be said of the PIE accentual system: PIE thematic nominals and thematic verbal stems all had fixed accent (i.e. on the same syllable throughout the paradigm), which was inherited in all attested daughter languages, although there exist some uncertainties regarding the simple thematic present. Some athematic nominals and verb stems also had fixed accent (chiefly on the root), but most had alternating, mobile accent, exhibiting several characteristic patterns; in all of them the surface accent was to the left in one group of inflected forms (nominoaccusative of nominals, active singular of verbs), and to the right in the rest. These facts are often interpreted as being the result of the interplay between individual morphemes, each of which belonged, unpredictably, to one of several accentual classes in PIE. According to this view, endings and stems could all be underlyingly accented or not, the leftmost underlying accent surfaced, and the words with no underlying accent were accented by default on the leftmost syllable.

Modern theories

Traditionally the PIE accent has been reconstructed in a straightforward way, by the comparison of Vedic, Ancient Greek and Germanic; e.g. PIE  'father' from Sanskrit pitā́, Ancient Greek , Gothic fadar. When the position of the accent matched in these languages, that was the accent reconstructed for "PIE proper". It was taken for granted that the Vedic accent was the most archaic and the evidence of Vedic could be used to resolve all the potentially problematic cases.

It was shown, however, by Vladislav Illich-Svitych in 1963 that the Balto-Slavic accent does not match the presupposed PIE accent reconstructed on the basis of Vedic and Ancient Greek — the Greek-Vedic barytones correspond to Balto-Slavic fixed paradigms (or barytone, or 1 accent paradigm), and Greek-Vedic oxytones correspond to Balto-Slavic mobile paradigms (or 2 accent paradigm, with orthotonic word-forms and forms-enclinomena). Moreover, in about a quarter of all cognate Vedic and Ancient Greek etymons accents do not match at all; e.g.
 PIE  'field' > Ancient Greek  : Vedic ájras
 PIE  'father-in-law' > Ancient Greek  : Vedic śváśuras
 PIE  'which' > Ancient Greek  : Vedic katarás

Valence theory
In 1973 (an early version of the hypothesis was presented in 1962), the Moscow accentological school, headed by linguists Vladimir Dybo and Sergei Nikolaev, has been reconstructing the PIE accentual system as a system of two tones or valences: + (dominant) and − (recessive). Proto-Indo-European would thus not have, as is usually reconstructed, a system of free accent such as is found in Vedic, but instead every morpheme would be inherently dominant or recessive, and the position of the accent would be later determined in various ways in the various daughter languages (depending on the combinations of (+) and (−) morphemes), so that Vedic would certainly not be the most archaic language. Many correspondences among IE languages, as well as certain phenomena in individual daughters dependent on PIE tones, should corroborate this interpretation.

Dybo lists several shortcomings in the traditional approach to the reconstruction of PIE accent. Amongst others, incorrect belief in the direct connection between the PIE accent and ablaut, which in fact does not explain the position of PIE accent at all. Usually, for example, it is thought that zero-grade should be unaccented, but that is evidently not valid for PIE (e.g.  'wolf',  'seven' etc.) according to the traditional reconstruction. Furthermore, Dybo claims that there is no phonological, semantic or morphological reason whatsoever for the classification of certain word to a certain accentual type, i.e. the traditional model cannot explain why Vedic  'wolf' is barytone and Vedic devás 'deity' is oxytone. According to Dybo, such discrepancies can only be explained by presupposing lexical tone in PIE.

See also
 Proto-Indo-European noun (see esp. section on athematic nouns and ablaut-accentual patterns)

Notes

Bibliography
 
 
 
 
 
 
 Roman Sukač, Introduction to Proto-Indo-European and Balto-Slavic Accentology. Newcastle upon Tyne: Cambridge Scholars Publishing, 2013.

Further reading

Accent
Tone (linguistics)